Sell can refer to:

People
 Brenda Sell (born 1955), American martial arts instructor and highest ranking non-Korean female practitioner of taekwondo
 Brian Sell (born 1978), American retired long-distance runner
 Edward Sell (priest) (1839–1932), Anglican orientalist, writer and missionary in India
 Edward B. Sell (1942-2014), founder of the United States Chung Do Kwan Association
 Epp Sell (1897–1961), American Major League Baseball pitcher
 Friedrich L. Sell (born 1954), German economist
 Helmuth (1898–1956) and Annemarie (1896–1972) Sell, German couple who saved a Jewish youth from the Holocaust
 John Sell (Democrat) (1816–1883), American Democratic politician
 John M. Sell (1863–1930), American Socialist politician
 Karl Sell (1907–1982), German orthopedic surgeon and founder of the discipline of manual medicine or chirotherapy
 Mary Elizabeth Sell, New York City Ballet dancer
 Michael Sell (born 1972), American tennis coach and former player
 Ronald A. Sell (born 1945), American politician
 William Sell (born 1998), Norwegian footballer
 William Edward Sell (1923–2004), Dean of the University of Pittsburgh School of Law
 Sell Hall (1888–1951), African-American music promoter and Negro league baseball player and executive

Acronym
 Syndicat des éditeurs de logiciels de loisirs (SELL), a French organization that promotes the interests of video game developers
 SELL Student Games, a multi-sport event for university and college students
 Southern Evacuation Lifeline (SELL), a proposed road in Horry County, South Carolina

Other uses
 Sell, West Virginia, United States, an unincorporated community
 Sell (professional wrestling), a wrestling term

See also
 Sell, Sell, Sell, a 1996 album by David Gray
 Sells (disambiguation)
 Selles (disambiguation)
 Selling

English toponymic surnames